Agnes of Solms-Laubach (7 January 1578 – 23 November 1602) was a Countess of Solms-Laubach and, by marriage, Landgravine of Hesse-Kassel from 1593 until her death.

Life 
Agnes was a daughter of Count John George (1546–1600), son of Count Frederick Magnus I of Solms-Laubach, from his marriage to Margaret of Schönburg-Glauchau (1554–1606).

She married at the age of 15, on 23 September 1593, to Kassel Landgrave Maurice of Hesse-Kassel, whom she had met at the wedding of his oldest sister Anna Maria.  Anna's wedding was celebrated in the presence of numerous princely guests.  The marriage to the Calvinist Countess increased Maurice ties with the Calvinist counts of Wetterau considerably, although Maurice had chosen Agnes as his wife more out of love than of dynastic calculation.

Agnes was described as exceptionally talented, beautiful and lovable. Matthäus Merian made an embroidery of the countess with her husband and children.  On the day after Anna's death, Maurice wrote to King Henry IV of France about his great loss.

Offspring 
From her marriage with Maurice, Agnes had following children:
 Otto (1594–1617)
 married firstly in 1613 Princess Katharina Ursula of Baden-Durlach (1593–1615)
 married secondly in 1617 Princess Agnes Magdalena of Anhalt-Dessau (1590–1626)
 Elisabeth (1596–1625)
 married in 1618 Duke John Albert II of Mecklenburg-Güstrow (1590–1636)
 Maurice (1600–1612)
 William V (1602–1637), Landgrave of Hesse-Kassel
 married in 1619 Countess Amalie Elisabeth of Hanau-Münzenberg (1602–1651)

References 
 Christian Roeth: history of Hesse, p. 225 ff.
 Heiner Borggrefe, Vera Lüpkes and Hans Otto Meyer (ed.): The scholar Maurice: a Renaissance prince in Europe, 1997
 Stefan Schweizer: interpretation of history and pictures from history, p. 270
 Alison Deborah Anderson: On the verge of war, p. 34 

|-

House of Solms-Laubach
1578 births
1602 deaths
Landgravines of Hesse-Kassel
Deaths in childbirth